Peltobatrachus (from Greek pelte, meaning shield and batrakhos, meaning frog) is an extinct genus of temnospondyl amphibian from the late Permian period of Tanzania. The sole species, Peltobatrachus pustulatus, is also the sole member of the family Peltobatrachidae.

Description 
It was a fully terrestrial amphibian, only returning to the water to lay its eggs.

To protect itself against predators such as the large gorgonopsid therapsids, it had developed an armadillo-like armored plating covering its body and tail. The armor consisted of broad plates on the shoulders and hips and narrower plates on the rest of the body. Although no teeth of the creature have been found, it probably fed on insects, worms, and snails.

References

Further reading 
 

Permian temnospondyls
Lopingian life
Permian amphibians of Africa
Permian Tanzania
Fossils of Tanzania
Fossil taxa described in 1959